Streetwalkin' is a 1985 American thriller film starring Melissa Leo. It was an early film from Concorde Pictures.

Plot
Cookie and her brother run away from their loveless mother and their abusive stepfather in Upstate New York and arrive in New York City. At the train station, Cookie meets a pimp named Duke. With his charm, he makes her fall in love with him and soon has her working as a prostitute. However, his brutality against her colleagues disgusts her.

Cast
 Melissa Leo as "Cookie"
 Dale Midkiff as "Duke"
 Leon Robinson as Jason
 Antonio Fargas as Finesse
 Julie Newmar as "Queen Bee"
 Randall Batinkoff as Tim
 Annie Golden as Phoebe
 Deborah Offner as Heather
 Khandi Alexander as "Star"
 Greg Germann as "Creepy"
 Kirk Taylor as "Spade" 
 Samantha Fox as Topless Dancer
 Conrad Roberts as Seller 
 Tom Wright as Henchman #1
 Daniel Jordano as Henchman #2
 Gary Howard Klar as Bouncer 
 Kim Chan as Desk Clerk

Production
Freeman wrote the film with her husband. It was shot over 24 nights in June 1984.

References

External links

Review of film at New York Times

1985 films
Films about prostitution in the United States
Films set in New York City
American thriller films
1985 thriller films
Films directed by Joan Freeman
1980s English-language films
1980s American films